Andersonville is a rural community in Saint James Parish, Charlotte County, New Brunswick, Canada.  Andersonville intersects with Route 3, Route 630, and Route 755.

History

Notable people

See also
List of communities in New Brunswick

References

Communities in Charlotte County, New Brunswick